Pelochyta acuta is a moth of the family Erebidae. It was described by Hervé de Toulgoët in 1984. It is found in Ecuador.

References

Pelochyta
Moths described in 1984